Cantiere navale di Palermo (Palermo Shipyard) is a shipyard in Palermo, Sicily. The premise falls within the Port of Palermo area. The Port Authority agreed a State concession to Fincantieri expiring 2057.
The shipyard has two graving docks (respectively by 400,000 dwt and 20,000 dwt) and one new building shipway.

History 
It was founded in 1897 by Ignazio Florio Jr., grandson of Vincenzo Florio Sr. Construction was protracted and Florio was forced to sell his stake in the shipyard to Attilio Odero in 1905. It was then amalgamated with the two shipyards belonging to Officine e Cantieri Liguri-Anconetani into Cantieri Navali Riuniti (CNR) on 31 January 1906. In 1925 CNR was renamed as Cantieri Navali del Tirreno after it gained control of the Cantiere navale di Riva Trigoso. After completing bankruptcy proceedings in August 1973, it came under the control of Italcantieri and then Fincantieri in 1984.

Ships built 
Notable ships built by Palermo Shipyard includes:
 the Soldati-class destroyers of Royal Italian Navy: Bersagliere and Granatiere in 1938
 the Capitani Romani-class cruiser Ulpio Traiano (1939)
 the Ro-Ro ferry MV Avrasya (built as Lazio in 1953)
 the freighter Grande America (1997)
 the offshore supply vessels UOS Challenger (2009),  UOS Enterprise, UOS Pathfinder and UOS Navigator (2010)

Bibliography

References

1897 establishments in Italy
Shipyards of Italy
Economy of Palermo
Fincantieri
Florio family
Shipbuilding companies of Italy